"Hail Purdue!" is the official fight song of Purdue University. The lyrics were written in about 1912 by James R. Morrison (class of 1915), and set to music by Edward S. Wotawa (class of 1912). The completed song was published in 1913, initially titled "Purdue War Song", and was dedicated to the Purdue Varsity Glee Club, of which Wotawa was a student member and director.  Until the adoption of the Purdue Hymn as university anthem in 1993, it frequently served as both fight song and alma mater, being played on ceremonial occasions such as commencements.

During the rest following the lyric, "Thus we raise our song anew", it is popular to raise one fist and shout, "Boiler up!". This chant was invented by Arnette Tiller early in her husband's time as Purdue's head football coach (1997–2008). The Purdue All-American Marching Band interjects, "Fire up!" at the same point in the song, as they have traditionally done since the mid-1970s.

Music

References

External links
 "Hail Purdue!" and soundclips to other songs performed by the Purdue University Bands

American college songs
College fight songs in the United States
Big Ten Conference fight songs
Purdue Boilermakers
1913 songs